Korada Ramakrishnaiya (2 October 1891 - 28 March 1962) was a Dravidian Philologist and litterateur. He was the first Telugu scholar to publish research works on Comparative Dravidian Linguistics (CDL).  He published the first Literary Criticism based on modern methods 'Andhra Bharata Kavita Vimarshanamu'. 

Ramakrishnaiya authored works of fundamental importance and extended the borders of Research in Telugu Literary Criticism, History of Telugu language, Philological interpretation of Telugu grammar, Cognate Dravidian vocabulary, Comparative Dravidian grammar, and Comparative Dravidian prosody.

Books

Telugu literary criticism

History of Telugu language

Philological interpretation of Telugu grammar

Cognate Dravidian vocabulary

Comparative Dravidian grammar

Comparative Dravidian prosody

Critical editions and translations

See also
 Dravidian studies
 Dravidian University
 Elamo-Dravidian
 Proto-Dravidian

References

1891 births
1962 deaths
Indian philologists
20th-century philologists